"You're Gonna Be OK" is a song by Jenn Johnson, which was released on May 8, 2017, as Brian & Jenn Johnson's lead single from their first studio album, After All These Years (2017).

Background
Composed by Jenn Johnson, Seth Mosley and Jeremy Riddle, the song was released as part of the Brian & Jenn Johnson compilation, After All These Years, on January 27, 2017.

On May 8, 2017, the radio version of the song was released as a digital download. The song also impacted Christian radio on May 26, 2017.

Writing and development
Jenn Johnson had an interview with Kevin Davis, lead contributor at NewReleaseToday about the song and the inspiration behind it. Davis asked about the personal story behind the song, to which Johnson responded saying:
A year and half ago, Brian was really going through a tough time, and it unraveled and he ended up having a nervous breakdown. ... It was a really difficult time, and God really helped him to deal with things like forgiveness and some tough meetings with people at that time. It was a beautiful, although terrible, time. Lamentations [3:28-30] says, "the 'worst' is never the worst." That was the verse that I hung onto.

 – Jenn Johnson, NewReleaseToday
Johnson also added that the song "felt like it was such a message and prophetic statement," and also "felt like God promised that if I wrote this song it would save people, and even people thinking of suicide can be filled with hope, even though we don't know what tomorrow holds." She also listed several scriptural references from various translations to affirm the song's message.

Accolades

Music videos
The official lyric video of the song was published on January 27, 2017, on Bethel Music's YouTube channel and has been viewed over 4 million times as of September 2017.

Track listing

Charts

Release history

References

2017 singles
2017 songs
Contemporary Christian songs
Songs written by Seth Mosley
Songs written by Jeremy Riddle